Batman: Year One is a 2011 American animated superhero film, based on the four-issue story arc of the same name printed in 1987. It premiered at Comic-Con on July 22 and was officially released on October 18, 2011. The film was directed by Lauren Montgomery and Sam Liu. It is the 12th film released under the DC Universe Animated Original Movies banner, and was released on DVD, Blu-ray, and digital copy. The film received positive reviews upon release for its animation and faithfulness to the source material, although the story was criticized. The film was also a commercial success, bringing in $6.1 million on a budget of $3.5 million. It is followed chronologically by the animated adaptation of Batman: The Dark Knight Returns.

Plot
Billionaire Bruce Wayne returns home to Gotham City after 12 years abroad, training for his eventual one-man war against crime to avenge his dead parents. James Gordon moves to Gotham City with his wife, Barbara Gordon, after a transfer from Chicago. Both are swiftly acquainted with the corruption and violent atmosphere of the city. Gordon tries to focus on purging corruption from the Gotham City Police Department after witnessing his partner, Detective Arnold John Flass, abuse his power as a cop. Unfortunately, several officers led by Flass beat him on the orders from his corrupt superior, Commissioner Gillian Loeb. In revenge, Gordon tracks Flass down, beats him, and leaves him naked and handcuffed in the snow.

Bruce believes he is still unprepared to fight against crime despite having the skills he learned from abroad. He goes in disguise on a surveillance mission in Gotham's red-light district, but is reluctantly drawn into a brawl with several prostitutes, Holly Robinson and Selina Kyle. Two police officers shoot Bruce on sight and take him away in their patrol car. Bruce breaks free, flees from the scene and returns to Wayne Manor barely alive. He sits before his father's bust, requesting guidance in his war against crime. A bat suddenly crashes through a window and settles on the bust, inspiring him to save Gotham as Batman.

Crimes significantly decline after weeks of Bruce acting as Batman. He even goes after Flass, who is in the middle of accepting a bribe from Jefferson Skeevers, a drug dealer of Carmine "The Roman" Falcone. Batman interrupts a dinner party held at the mansion of Gotham's mayor and announces that everyone in the party shall be brought to justice for their crimes someday. Infuriated by Batman's threats, Loeb orders Gordon and GCPD Detective Sarah Essen to arrest him. The two cops later come across a runaway truck that nearly hits an old lady. Batman manages to save the lady's life while Gordon stops the truck. Batman then flees into an abandoned building where Loeb immediately orders a bomb dropped on. He also sends in a SWAT team led by a trigger-happy commander, Branden, to kill any survivors left in the building. Batman uses a signal device to attract a swarm of bats from the Batcave as his only route to escape. After witnessing Batman in action, Selina is inspired to don a costume of her own and begin a life of crime.

Gordon and Essen have a brief affair together and spend two months dating. She, however, chooses to leave Gotham upon learning he is going to be the father of Barbara's unborn child. Gordon is left alone to investigate Bruce's connection to Batman. He travels to Wayne Manor with Barbara to interrogate Bruce, who uses his playboy charms to divert suspicion. While leaving the manor, Gordon confesses his affair with Essen to Barbara. Skeevers gets bailed with the help of a hired lawyer, but is attacked by Batman shortly after who convinces him to testify against Flass. Skeevers is drugged with rat poison as an assassination attempt, so that he remains silent about the ties between the police force and the mafia, although Skeevers survives after all.

Bruce sneaks into Falcone's manor as Batman and overhears the private conversation between the Roman and his nephew, Johnny Viti. He predicts their intentions to target Gordon's family, so he disguises himself as a motorcyclist to help Gordon. Gordon leaves home on Loeb's orders, but becomes suspicious and turns back only to discover Viti and his men already holding his family hostage. Viti flees the scene with Gordon's infant son. Gordon chases after him on Bruce's motorcycle. The two men end up fighting on a bridge until the baby falls. Bruce catches up on time and leaps over the bridge's railing to save the baby while Viti dies from the fall. Gordon thanks Bruce for saving his infant son's life and lets him go. Flass supplies Assistant District Attorney Harvey Dent with the evidence and testimony needed to implicate Loeb, who resigns in disgrace. Gordon is promoted to captain and prepares to meet with Batman in order to investigate a potential plot orchestrated by a criminal calling himself the Joker.

Voice cast

Production
Producer Bruce Timm noted that the adaptation of the film was relatively straightforward due to the cinematic nature of the original story arc. Bryan Cranston originally turned down the role as James Gordon because he was unfamiliar with both animation and classic comics. Cranston said: "I wasn't aware of this level of storytelling in animation."

Reception

Critical response 
Batman: Year One received positive reviews upon its release.

An IGN review of the film, after its Comic-Con screening, praised the voice actors and concluded with, "This is real, serious adult entertainment that should satisfy longtime fans and newcomers as well." Another review from IGN panned the film, describing it as "dead on arrival – a lifeless bore with stale voice work and a disjointed, sporadic narrative that was best kept on the pages of Frank Miller's stellar graphic novel."
Tommy Cook of Collider called the film a "faithful adaptation".
The A.V. Club gave the film an A−, saying, "Batman: Year One is a stellar adaptation, copying Miller's words and Mazzucchelli's images almost verbatim at times." Concluding that, "It all recalls what it felt like to read Batman: Year One for the first time, and sense that this was a story that had always existed."

Cinemacrazed criticized the short run time of the film as its main downfall.
James O'Ehley of SciFiMoviePage notes that the faithfulness to the source material works for and against the film, with voiceover and dialogue slowing down the action, and he goes on to say how the animation could be bolder, the voices gruffer and the sound more stirring but that overall the film is better than other DC animated films.

In an article for The Missing Slate, discussing the influence of the comic version of Batman: Year One on film depictions of Batman, Michael Dodd praised the casting of Bryan Cranston as James Gordon. Referencing Cranston's famous role as Walter White on Breaking Bad, he argued that the choice of casting "truly encompassed the character's determination and downright badass attitude in the comic Year One".

Sales
The film earned $6.1 million from domestic home media sales.

Home media
The DVD and Blu-ray release includes a short animated film titled Catwoman. In the film, Catwoman deals with the crime boss Rough Cut (voiced by John DiMaggio) while trying to stop a cargo shipment.
There is also a sneak peek for the 2012 film Justice League: Doom, two featurettes, a commentary, a digital comic book, two Batman: The Animated Series episodes ("Catwalk" and "Cult of the Cat"), a standard edition of the film, and a high definition edition of the film.

On August 11, 2015, Warner Home Video re-released the film on a combo pack, which includes the graphic novel it was based on and a copy of DVD and Blu-ray.

In 2019, it was released as part of the Batman 80th Anniversary DVD Collection, which came with 18 animated Batman movies. It released alongside Batman: Gotham Knight, Batman: Under the Red Hood, Batman vs. Robin, Batman: Bad Blood, Son of Batman, Batman: The Dark Knight Returns, Parts 1 and 2, Batman: Assault on Arkham, Batman: The Killing Joke, Batman: Gotham by Gaslight, Batman Ninja, Batman: Return of the Caped Crusaders, Batman: Mask of the Phantasm, Batman: Mystery of the Batwoman, Superman/Batman: Public Enemies, and Superman/Batman: Apocalypse. 

On November 9, 2021, the film got a 4K UHD Blu-ray remastered as part of its 10th anniversary since October 18, 2011 with the title as Commemorative Edition.

References

External links

 

2011 animated films
2011 films
2011 direct-to-video films
2011 action thriller films
2010s American animated films
2010s direct-to-video animated superhero films
2010s animated superhero films
Adultery in films
American action thriller films
American animated action films
Animated Batman films
DC Universe Animated Original Movies
Films based on works by Frank Miller
Films directed by Sam Liu
Films directed by Lauren Montgomery
Films with screenplays by Tab Murphy
Law enforcement in fiction
Toonami
2010s English-language films